The preliminary stages of the 2012 Copa Bridgestone Sudamericana de Clubes consisted of two stages:
First Stage (first legs: July 24–26, July 31–August 2; second legs: August 7–9, 14–16, 21, 23)
Second Stage, divided into three sections:
Argentina (first legs: August 16, 22–23; second legs: August 29–30)
Brazil (first legs: July 31–August 1; second legs: August 21–23)
Rest of South America (first legs: August 28–30; second legs: September 18–20)

Format
The draw was made in Luque on June 29, 2012. Thirty-two teams (all from rest of South America) competed in the First Stage, where they were drawn into sixteen ties. The sixteen winners of the First Stage joined another fourteen teams (six from Argentina, eight from Brazil) to compete in the Second Stage, where they were drawn into fifteen ties.

Teams played in two-legged ties on a home-away basis. Each team earned 3 points for a win, 1 point for a draw, and 0 points for a loss. The following criteria were used for breaking ties on points:
Goal difference
Away goals
Penalty shootout (no extra time is played)
The fifteen winners of the Second Stage advanced to the round of 16 to join the defending champion Universidad de Chile.

First stage
Team 1 played the second leg at home.

|-
!colspan=6|South Zone

|-
!colspan=6|North Zone

|}

Match G1

Olimpia won on points 4–1.

Match G2

Tied on points 3–3, Nacional won on goal difference.

Match G3

Universidad Católica won on points 4–1.

Match G4

Tied on points 3–3, Guaraní won on away goals.

Match G5

Liverpool won in points 6–0.

Match G6

Aurora won in points 4–1.

Match G7

Cobreloa won on points 4–1.

Match G8

Cerro Porteño won on points 4–1.

Match G9

Millonarios won on points 4–1.

Match G10

Emelec won on points 4–1.

Match G11

Mineros won on points 6–0.

Match G12

Barcelona won on points 4–1.

Match G13

Deportes Tolima won on points 4–1.

Match G14

Deportivo Quito won on points 6–0.

Match G15

Envigado won on points 4–1.

Match G16

LDU Loja won on points 6–0.

Second stage

|}

Match O1

Millonarios won on points 4–1.

Match O2

São Paulo won on points 6–0.

Match O3

Note: Second leg postponed from September 19 due to bad weather.
Liverpool won on points 4–1.

Match O4

Tigre won on points 6–0.

Match O5

Cerro Porteño won on points 4–1.

Match O6

Tied on points 2–2, Atlético Goianiense won on penalties.

Match O7

Emelec won on points 4–1.

Match O8

Tied on points 3–3, Grêmio won on away goals.

Match O9

Barcelona won on points 4–1.

Match O11

Tied on points 3–3, Universidad Católica won on away goals.

Match O12

Colón won on points 6–0.

Match O13

Deportivo Quito won on points 6–0.

Match O14

Tied on points 2–2, Independiente won on away goals.

Match O15

Tied on points 3–3, LDU Loja won on away goals.

Match O16

Tied on points 3–3, Palmeiras won on away goals.

References

External links
Official webpage 

Preliminary Stages